The Evangelical Church in Central Germany (German: Evangelische Kirche in Mitteldeutschland; EKM) is a United church body covering most of the German states of Saxony-Anhalt and Thuringia and some adjacent areas in Brandenburg and Saxony.

History 
The Church was formed on 1 January 2009 when the Evangelical Church of the Church Province of Saxony merged with the Evangelical Lutheran Church in Thuringia and became the Evangelical Church in Central Germany. The Church is the most important Christian denomination in Thuringia and Saxony-Anhalt.

The bishop's seat is Magdeburg, the capital of Saxony-Anhalt. The Church is a full member of the federation of Lutheran, Reformed and United Protestant churches in Germany called Evangelical Church in Germany. Its principal church is Magdeburg Cathedral.

Ilse Junkermann was the Landesbischof (bishop) of the church from 2009 for 10 years. In September 2019, Friedrich Kramer (b. 1964) became her successor.

Practices 
Ordination of women and blessing of same-sex marriages are allowed.

References

External links 
 

Member churches of the Evangelical Church in Germany
United and uniting churches
Christianity in Thuringia
Christianity in Saxony-Anhalt
Lutheran World Federation members
Christian organizations established in 2009
Protestant denominations established in the 21st century
2009 establishments in Germany